Red Tornado may refer to:

Red Tornado, the name of different DC Comics characters
The Red Tornado (album), an album by Red Rodney